Marie-Christine Dalloz (born 10 January 1958) is a French politician of The Republicans who has been serving as a member of the National Assembly of France since 2007, representing the Jura department.

Political career
In parliament, Dalloz is a member of the Committee on Finances, Economic Affairs and Budget Control. In addition to her committee assignments, she is the president of the Parliamentary Friendship Group with Jamaica and a member of the groups for Burkina Faso, Italy and Switzerland.

Dalloz has also been serving as member of the French delegation to the Parliamentary Assembly of the Council of Europe since 2014. As member of the European People's Party group, she served as chairwoman of the Committee on Social Affairs, Health and Sustainable Development before becoming a member of the Committee on Political Affairs and Democracy. She participated in several cross-party delegations to observe the 2017 parliamentary elections in Bulgaria, the 2018 presidential election in Montenegro, and the 2019 presidential election in North Macedonia.

Political positions
In 2016, Dalloz publicly endorsed Nicolas Sarkozy in the Republicans' primaries for the 2017 presidential elections.

In July 2019, Dalloz voted against the French ratification of the European Union’s Comprehensive Economic and Trade Agreement (CETA) with Canada.

References

1958 births
Living people
People from Saint-Claude, Jura
Politicians from Bourgogne-Franche-Comté
Union for a Popular Movement politicians
The Republicans (France) politicians
Women members of the National Assembly (France)
Deputies of the 13th National Assembly of the French Fifth Republic
Deputies of the 14th National Assembly of the French Fifth Republic
Deputies of the 15th National Assembly of the French Fifth Republic
21st-century French women politicians
Deputies of the 16th National Assembly of the French Fifth Republic
Members of Parliament for Jura